Rissa Church is a parish church of the Church of Norway in Indre Fosen municipality in Trøndelag county, Norway. It is located in the village of Leira, just northeast of the village of Årnset. It is one of the churches for the Rissa parish which is part of the Fosen prosti (deanery) in the Diocese of Nidaros. The gray, stone church was built in a long church style in 1888 using plans drawn up by the architect Carl Julius Bergstrøm (1828-1898). The church seats about 650 people.

History

The church for the Rissa parish was Rein Church for many centuries. The new church would be called Rissa Church. This new church was built out of stone and it was consecrated on 26 October 1888. It has an entry porch with a tower on the west end and a choir flanked by two small sacristies on each side on the east end of the building. Later, in 1931, a new Rein Church was built on the site of the old church.

See also
List of churches in Nidaros

References

Indre Fosen
Churches in Trøndelag
Long churches in Norway
Stone churches in Norway
19th-century Church of Norway church buildings
Churches completed in 1888
1888 establishments in Norway